Uglenskaya is a rural locality (a village) in Nizhneslobodskoye Rural Settlement, Vozhegodsky District, Vologda Oblast, Russia. The population was 12 as of 2002.

Geography 
Uglenskaya is located 39 km east of Vozhega (the district's administrative centre) by road. Zarechnaya is the nearest rural locality.

References 

Rural localities in Vozhegodsky District